Opawa is an inner suburb of Christchurch, New Zealand, located 2.5 kilometres south-east of the city centre.

The name is a contraction of "Ōpāwaho", which, in Māori, means a place of ('ō') an outer pā or outpost ('pāwaho'). "Ōpāwaho" or "Opaawaho" is the Māori name for the Ōpāwaho / Heathcote River.

Demographics

Opawa had a population of 1,365 at the 2018 New Zealand census, an increase of 63 people (4.8%) since the 2013 census, and a decrease of 69 people (-4.8%) since the 2006 census. There were 504 households. There were 642 males and 723 females, giving a sex ratio of 0.89 males per female. The median age was 47.5 years (compared with 37.4 years nationally), with 219 people (16.0%) aged under 15 years, 186 (13.6%) aged 15 to 29, 621 (45.5%) aged 30 to 64, and 342 (25.1%) aged 65 or older.

Ethnicities were 90.8% European/Pākehā, 6.6% Māori, 1.3% Pacific peoples, 5.1% Asian, and 2.4% other ethnicities (totals add to more than 100% since people could identify with multiple ethnicities).

The proportion of people born overseas was 21.3%, compared with 27.1% nationally.

Although some people objected to giving their religion, 52.7% had no religion, 37.8% were Christian, 0.9% were Hindu, 1.1% were Buddhist and 2.2% had other religions.

Of those at least 15 years old, 363 (31.7%) people had a bachelor or higher degree, and 195 (17.0%) people had no formal qualifications. The median income was $33,300, compared with $31,800 nationally. The employment status of those at least 15 was that 501 (43.7%) people were employed full-time, 180 (15.7%) were part-time, and 30 (2.6%) were unemployed.

Education
Ōpāwa School is a full primary school for years 1 to 8, with a roll of  students. It opened in 1872.

Christchurch Rudolf Steiner School is a state-integrated composite school for years 1 to 13, with a roll of  students. The school opened in 1975 and became state-integrated in 1989.

St Mark's School is an Anglican state-integrated full primary school for years 1 to 8. It has a roll of  students. It started in 1921.

All these schools are coeducational. Rolls are as of

References

Suburbs of Christchurch